The Reform Party was a Norwegian political party. It was founded on 12 October 2004 and was a candidate for the 2005 Storting election in six counties: Akershus, Møre og Romsdal, Oppland, Rogaland, Vestfold and Østfold. It received 727 votes (0.03%).

It was founded as a party in opposition to the toll plaza around Tønsberg, and had as its main issue opposition against user financing of highway construction in Norway. The party was disestablished on 13 July 2009.

References

Defunct political parties in Norway
Political parties established in 2004
2004 establishments in Norway
Political parties disestablished in 2009
2009 disestablishments in Norway